Ghodasgaon is a hamlet in Shirpur Taluka of Dhule district, Maharashtra. It is located on bank of Aner river which is a small tributary of western flowing Tapi river. Ghodasgaon is 70 km from the district centre city Dhule of Dhule district.

Geography
Ghodasgaon is a village situated at the bank of Aner River, which sub-river of Tapi. The nearest prominent railway stations on the main route are Bhusaval and Chalisgaon. Nardana (Taluka Sindkheda & Amalner) is the nearest station. Bus service is available to Bhusaval, Gujarat and MP state.

Population and economy
In this small village of 1200, Banana farming is a major occupation.

Ghodasgaon village have one cooperative bank named "K. Annasaheb Bipinchandra Bhoma Patil G.B.S. Patsanstha Ghodasgaon" it is a home branch.

Education
Primary education is provided by the public school up until grade 5.

See also
 Shirpur

References

External links
Official website

Villages in Dhule district